Ramona Brussig (20 May 1977) is a German judoka and two-time gold medal winner in Paralympic competition. She was born in Leipzig with visual impairments meaning that she competes in B2 classification events. Brussig has an identical twin sister, Carmen Brussig, also a gold medal-winning visually-impaired judoka, who was born 15 minutes before her. Brussig began training in 1986 at the age of nine and made her senior international debut in 1998 at the World Games in Madrid. Though her sister lives in Switzerland, the pair like to meet up and train together when they can. They say that they do not have a sense of rivalry as they compete in different weight classes.

Brussig won gold in the under 57 kg weight class at the 2004 Games in Athens, her first Paralympic Games, against Spanish judoka Marta Arce Payno. She then won silver four years later in Beijing, losing to Wang Lijing in the final. Brussig and Wang both dropped down a weight class to under 52 kg for the 2012 Summer Paralympics in London, meeting each other again in the final. This time Brussig was triumphant, going home with the gold. Brussig defended her title at the Rio 2016 and finished as runner-up to French judoka Sandrine Martinet, earning her a silver medal.

Through her career Brussig has won four world titles and six European titles. She says that one of her most treasured memories was winning gold in London just 15 minutes after her twin sister achieved the same feat. Both sisters are listed amongst the most promising German medal candidates for the 2020 Summer Paralympics in Tokyo, resulting in them being given financial support in their endeavours.

Brussig works for the sports association of Mecklenburg-Vorpommern, a state in northern Germany.

Competitive results
:

Paralympic Games
2016 - 2nd place
2012 - 1st place
2008 - 2nd place
2004 - 1st place

World Championships
2014 - 2nd place
2011 - 3rd place
2010 - 1st place
2007 - 3rd place singles and team
2006 - 1st place singles and team

European Championships
2013 - 1st place
2011 - 3rd place
2009 - 1st place
2007 - 1st place singles and team
2005 - 1st place singles and team
2001 - 1st place team
1999 - 1st place team

German championships
2014 - 1st place
2011 - 1st place
2009 - 1st place
2008 - 1st place
2007 - 1st place
2006 - 1st place
2005 - 1st place
2003 - 1st place
2002 - 1st place
2001 - 1st place
2000 - 1st place
1999 - 1st place

References

External links
 
 
 

1977 births
Living people
German female judoka
Judoka at the 2004 Summer Paralympics
Judoka at the 2008 Summer Paralympics
Judoka at the 2012 Summer Paralympics
Judoka at the 2016 Summer Paralympics
Paralympic gold medalists for Germany
Medalists at the 2004 Summer Paralympics
Medalists at the 2008 Summer Paralympics
Medalists at the 2012 Summer Paralympics
Medalists at the 2016 Summer Paralympics
Judoka at the 2015 European Games
European Games medalists in judo
European Games bronze medalists for Germany
Paralympic medalists in judo
Paralympic judoka of Germany
Sportspeople from Leipzig
20th-century German women
21st-century German women